Sovereign Grace Churches (SGM; previously Sovereign Grace Ministries and People of Destiny International, PDI) is a group of Reformed, neocharismatic, Evangelical, restorationist, Christian churches primarily located in North America. It has variously been described as a family of churches, a denomination, and an apostolic network. It has also been described as a cult, due to its unorthodox teachings, systemic control of members, and allegations of covering-up child sex abuse. Besides the North American congregations, there are also congregations in Australia, Bolivia, Ethiopia, Great Britain, Germany and Mexico.

History 

The organization of over 80 member churches grew out of the charismatic renewal of the 1970s under the leadership of Larry Tomczak.  It has its roots in a charismatic prayer meeting in Silver Spring, Maryland, then Washington, DC called Take and Give (TAG), which grew into Covenant Life Church, the former flagship of Sovereign Grace. Tomczak co-founded the church with C. J. Mahaney. Mahaney describes himself as a "former pothead." Larry Tomczak withdrew from the Charismatic Catholic scene shortly before the creation of Covenant Life Church.

In 1981, Brent Detweiler, pastor of Indiana Christian Fellowship in Indiana, Pennsylvania, asked Mahaney and Tomczak to provide oversight and accountability for his church. The two churches formed an informal church-planting partnership. In 1982, shortly after planting a church in Cleveland, Mahaney, Tomczak and Detweiler formed People of Destiny International as an umbrella organization for their various ministries. The original apostolic team comprised Mahaney, Tomczak, Detweiler and Bill Galbraith.
 
Tomczak and Mahaney and the movement were influenced by Bryn Jones and Terry Virgo, leaders of the British New Church Movement. Both Tomczak and Mahaney spoke at New Frontiers' Bible Weeks and Stoneleigh Conference.
They were also friendly with Maranatha Campus Ministries for a period.

In "The Blackwell Encyclopedia of Modern Christian Thought" published in 1995, Alister McGrath associated PDI with the Shepherding Movement and described it as having "informal links with Bryn Jones," the UK house church leader. In the mid-1990s, while Tomczak was still involved in the group's leadership, religious anthropologist Dr. Karla Poewe wrote that "Vineyard is particularly attractive to the young and intellectual... People of Destiny serves a Catholic constituency" although participants at that time would not agree with this assessment, contrasting PDI with the Vineyard Church.

The theological focus gradually shifted during the mid 1990s and it was later suggested that the increasing New Calvinism of PDI was a major factor in Larry Tomczak's departure from the movement.

Although reconciled with C. J. Mahaney in 2011, Tomczak earlier described the parting of ways with Sovereign Grace Ministries as "an unbelievable nightmare" during which his family "were threatened in various ways if [they] did not cooperate with [PDI/SGM]... A letter was circulated in an attempt to discredit me and to distort the events surrounding my departure." Other notable charismatic figures, such as Lou Engle, founder of The Call prayer concerts, and Ché Ahn, pastor of Harvest Rock Church in Pasadena, CA, also ceased to be formally associated with PDI during this period.

As of 2008 the group identified itself as "a family of churches passionate about the gospel of Jesus Christ... with a strong doctrinal basis that is evangelical, Reformed, and continuationist."
This move towards Reformed (or Calvinist) doctrine is illustrated by Sovereign Grace's partnerships with Reformed theologians--such as John MacArthur, Mark Dever, and John Piper--in events like the Together for the Gospel Conferences.

In the summer of 2009, Detweiler, who had left the SGM board in 2009, released a series of documents detailing numerous grievances with Mahaney, including concerns about Mahaney's leadership style.  On July 6, 2011, Mahaney announced that he would be taking a leave of absence as a team reviewed charges brought against him of "pride, unentreatability, deceit, sinful judgment, and hypocrisy."  One of the purposes for this period included reconciliation with former SGM ministers. Larry Tomczak reported that Mahaney had gone out of his way to rebuild their relationship after 13 years of estrangement. On January 25, 2012, Mahaney was reinstated as president of the organization by the board after three review panels found no reason to disqualify C.J. from his role as President, or to "call into question his fitness for gospel ministry."

Early in 2012, Sovereign Grace Ministries announced their intention to relocate their headquarters from Gaithersburg, Maryland to Louisville, Kentucky, citing Louisville's lower cost of living as well as the growing connection with the Southern Baptist Theological Seminary in town. Some critics have suggested that the move may have more to do with the fractured state of the organization's relationship with the SGM flagship church, Covenant Life Church in Gaithersburg.

Later in 2012, the movement's former flagship, Covenant Life Church, departed from SGM, a decision supported by an overwhelming 93% of voting members. Additionally, the Sovereign Grace churches in Indiana and Altoona, PA, Sarasota and Daytona Beach, FL and Charlottesville, VA cut ties with the movement during this period.  Daytona Beach's pastor Jesse Jarvis noted a “leadership culture characterized by excessive authority and insufficient accountability” as rationale for the church's departure.  The Indiana church, as mentioned above, was one of the charter members of SGM. About 80 churches from the United States and around the world remained in the organization.

By March, 2013 approximately 20 churches had left Sovereign Grace Ministries. During that same month C.J. Mahaney announced "that he would step down as president of SGM's beleaguered network of churches."

In January 2015, Joshua Harris, leader of SGM's former flagship church, Covenant Life Church resigned as lead pastor, saying he planned to attend Seminary to pursue more formal education and connection to other branches of Christianity. He believed that "the isolation of Covenant Life, and of a small cluster of churches of which it was a part, may have fed leadership mistakes, including the decision of pastors — himself among them — to handle a child sexual abuse case internally instead of going to police."

History of name changes 

Sovereign Grace Churches was known as "People of Destiny International" until 1998. British restorationist leader Terry Virgo states that Larry Tomczak and C. J. Mahaney, leaders at the time, had become "increasingly uncomfortable" with the "People of Destiny International" name, and it was shortened to "PDI Ministries". In 2002, the group adopted its next name of "Sovereign Grace Ministries."

In December 2014, executive director Mark Prater announced that the group's name would change to "Sovereign Grace Churches", to reflect its newly changed structure.

Church planting 

Church planter Fred Herron described the PDI/SGM church planting method of founding new churches: a pastor leads a group of members to relocate to a different city and form, or plant, a new church.

The first church adoption was in Cleveland Ohio.  North Coast Church formerly called Crossroads Christian Community was founded in 1980.  It was a growing fellowship of 200 people but lacked the apostolic oversight for greater growth.  Co-pastors Steve Witt and Bob Cohen invited an "Apostolic Team" the fall of 1980 to come and assist in "apostolic restructuring."  Steve Witt's father had been influential in Larry Tomczaks salvation and transfer from Cleveland to DC area. A team arrived in April of 1981 of 11  people, including Tomczak and family.  They stay one year and returned to DC leaving behind a team to monitor and build North Coast Church.  North Coast thrived and grew until its ultimate demise decades later. 

For many years, PDI did not adopt existing churches, but later altered its policy. SGM adoption of an existing church begins with the development of a relationship with leadership and continues with dialogue to evaluate the doctrinal and practical compatibility of Sovereign Grace with the church desiring adoption.

Sovereign Grace Music 

Sovereign Grace Churches also operates Sovereign Grace Music, based in Louisville, Kentucky, where contemporary worship albums have been released every few years since the 1980s. Sovereign Grace Music is directed by worship leader Bob Kauflin, former member of Christian band Glad, and is known for lyrics that are founded in biblical doctrine. Kauflin employs many other songwriters and pastors from other churches to aid in the songwriting process for Sovereign Grace Music. In 2011, Sovereign Grace Music's album Risen charted at No. 41 on the Billboard Top Christian Albums chart. Since then, five other albums have charted, the highest being From Age To Age (2012) at No. 25.

Claims of Abuse Cover-Up 

In late 2012, a lawsuit in Montgomery County, Maryland was brought against Sovereign Grace Ministries, making accusations of a conspiracy to cover-up child sex abuse. The plaintiffs claimed that church leaders, including Mahaney, did not report accusations of misconduct to the police.  Larry Tomczak, a co-founder of SGM, who left the organization in the late 1990s, was alleged to have abused and assaulted a child in the form of administering corporal punishment over a period of twenty-five years.   Tomczak was investigated and no charges were filed against him. All of the others who were named in the lawsuit, including Covenant Life Church pastors in Maryland, Sovereign Grace employees, and Fairfax Church in Virginia, were also investigated by law enforcement and no charges were brought. 

The plaintiffs only asked the court to determine whether or not there had been a conspiracy to cover up abuse. Judge Burrell found that any conspiracy to cover-up should have been brought within the time frame of the alleged abuse. Therefore, all of the claims by the Maryland plaintiffs were dismissed in May 2013 because the statute of limitations had expired, 3 years after each turned 18; the claims by two Virginia plaintiffs were still within the statute of limitations.  An appeal of the lower court's decision was heard by the Maryland appellate court in May 2014, and the lawsuit was again dismissed when the court found that the Plaintiff's attorney had filed the appeal too early. Maryland's highest civil court, the Court of Appeals, denied certiorari on September 24, 2014, permanently ending the case.

All charges brought by the Maryland plaintiffs were dismissed by Maryland Circuit Judge Sharon Burrell, permanently barring plaintiffs from ever bringing those or related charges in Maryland civil court again at any time in the future. During the hearing, Judge Burrell referred to an affidavit filed by Brent Detwiler supporting the claims of the plaintiffs as "vague and irrelevant".  The court also found that the "Covenant Life School" sued by the plaintiffs did not exist during the time frame of the alleged abuse.

As reported in Time Magazine (February 2016), Susan Burke, the lawyer for the victims, plans to file another lawsuit in Virginia, involving the two individuals from that jurisdiction. As of January 2018, two years later, no such lawsuit has been filed.

Maryland State Senate Committee Hearings (March 2016) 

On March 8, 2016, two individuals testified before the Maryland State Senate Judicial Proceedings Committee regarding the Sovereign Grace Ministries lawsuit. Charlotte Ennis, a member of the church, testified that the lawsuit was, "an egregious, and even bizarre, $50 million class action suit alleging child sexual abuse and cover up that was undoubtedly false."  According to Ennis, the lawsuit originally asked for $50 million in damages, but as the deposition and discovery process went on, "the plaintiffs tried hard to settle out of court for a much lower sum". She testified that the defense had refused to settle out of court requiring that the case be heard in court on its merits. As a result, the case was dismissed. Ennis testified only about the Maryland plaintiffs. (Ennis testified that in addition to her personal involvement with the Palmer situation she had a professional background as a Research Manager for a news organization).

1. In the Palmer case, brought by Renee Palmer Gamby, Ennis testified that, 
Documentation was found showing the family of one plaintiff was immediately advised to notify authorities.  Witnesses (I was one) were prepared to testify under oath to that fact.  That child was abused at age 2 by a babysitter whose case was criminally prosecuted in 1993.

2. In the case brought by Robin Roe (pseudonym), Ennis testified that, Another church plaintiff was never abused, (her sister was abused by her father who was prosecuted in 1987), but that plaintiff claimed the church had incarcerated her, ruining her life.  Actually, she was charged and imprisoned by state and federal authorities for crimes of fraud, theft, drug possession, drug trafficking, and weapons concerns.  Predictably, the judge questioned her very legitimacy as a plaintiff.  The actual victim did not participate in that lawsuit.

(Allegation Number 57 of the lawsuit reads, As a result of the Church's conduct and misrepresentations, Robin Roe was not cared for by loving and responsible adults, but instead was incarcerated in a juvenile half-way house with criminal juveniles.) 

3. Ennis testified that, "A third plaintiff eventually withdrew her allegations, admitting they were false."

4. Regarding the alleged pedophile ring at the church's school Ennis testified that, Investigators found that the supposed ringleader teacher was not even at the school for the majority of that year.  He was in the hospital because his back was so bad he couldn't walk. The actual teacher was the accuser's own mother.  The allegations included closets and rooms that did not match those in the school building. To date the police have filed no charges against anyone in that case. Ennis testified that regarding the three plaintiffs alleging charges of multiple cases of child sex abuse and rape at the church school, "Not one of those plaintiffs has filed criminal charges even though there is no criminal statute of limitations in Maryland.  False criminal charges can result in a jail term or hefty fine, however."

Ennis went on to testify that an "extensive and undoubtedly expensive" investigation was conducted by the Montgomery County Police Department but no charges were ever filed.  A subsequent examination of the case, conducted by an independent investigator, found that the allegations of child sex abuse detailed in the lawsuit "likely never happened at all" (except for the two which had been promptly reported and prosecuted several decades earlier).

At the same Senate hearing another individual, Terry Mayo, also testified.  Mayo testified that her husband was one of the accused in the Sovereign Grace lawsuit and that "she and her husband had experienced the nightmare of false accusations."  His accuser was plaintiff Heather Thompson Bryant.

Mayo testified, 
In 2013, in a lawsuit against our church, a woman accused my husband and three others of molesting her twenty-five years earlier. She didn't remember the alleged “abuses” before her thirties, and then believed she was recovering lost memories. She also imagined that 18 people witnessed the abuse, and she listed them by name. However, none of those named supported her stories of abuse. Montgomery County police investigated and filed no charges. After eighteen months, an independent investigator concluded her accusations likely never happened. But that didn't spare us from a witch hunt. In the initial months, the accused were labeled child sex offenders and the story of the abuse, truth be damned, was aggressively promoted in news, radio and social media.
 
1)	We received online threats that flyers would go out to our neighbors, “informing” them of the “pedophile” at our address. 
2)	Anonymous calls were made to business clients, threatening them for doing business with us.
3)	Online forums ripped us to shreds.
4)	Minor children, suffocated by public reaction, suffered horribly.  
5)	An un-accused spouse was laid off and later denied another job.
6)	People withdrew from us, or fell silent.
7)	Questions harassed us: Could we lose everything financing a defense?

Mayo also testified that her "husband had contemporaneous records from the 1980s that refuted the allegations."

Mayo said, at the close of her Senate Committee testimony, "I was burned by sexual abuse in the early 70s; we’re being burned by the false accusation of it now. An internet lynch mob can go on forever, but the law should protect innocent people from legal charges they can’t defend, like those from the distant past. The current statute gives survivors sufficient time for litigation, and a lifetime to bring charges to criminal court. Survivors and non-survivors alike need legal protection. The law as it stands, does both. Until you’ve experienced your life ripped open by false accusations, please consider that what happened to us can happen to anyone. That puts this proposal squarely in the category of more-harm-than-good."

Ennis said, during her Senate Committee testimony, that she was in favor of extending the statute of limitations for child sexual abuse, but that the proposed 2016 bill, SB 69, did not have "enough teeth" to prevent lawsuits based on false accusations against individuals or organizations.

Pam Palmer, who organized the lawsuit and is also the mother of plaintiff Renee Palmer Gamby, was present and testified at the March 8, 2016 Maryland Senate Committee Hearing in favor of SB 69.

SB 69 died in committee following the hearing.

The following year a new bill, HB 642, was introduced and passed by the Maryland State Legislature.  HB 642, the first bill of its kind to be supported by the Catholic Church in Maryland, extended the statute of limitations to 20 years after the age of majority, but makes it much more difficult to implicate a church or civic organization in a child sex abuse civil suit after the plaintiff turns 25. That bill was signed into law by Maryland Governor Larry Hogan on March 4, 2017.

=== Washingtonian Magazine''' article ===

A story in Washingtonian Magazine, by Tiffany Stanley, dated February 14, 2016, highlights three families who were plaintiffs in the lawsuit and their involvement with Sovereign Grace Ministries. The article quotes Plaintiff's attorney, Susan Burke, saying that she "plans to file a new suit in Virginia against the Fairfax church on behalf of at least two plaintiffs." As of January 2018, two years later, no new lawsuit has been filed.

 Covenant Life apology 
Leaders of the Fairfax, Virginia, church accused in the lawsuit have "acknowledged the stories of abuse and issued a tearful apology to the families....  senior pastor Mark Mullery blamed the church’s model of reconciliation. 'This resulted in the victim’s family being corrected when they should have been gently cared for as sufferers,'” he said, according to the Washingtonian Magazine'' article.

Nathaniel Morales 
In a different case in 2014, Nathaniel Morales, a youth mentor at Covenant Life Church, who "led youth bible studies, directed worship teams, and even attended sleepovers," was convicted of abusing four boys between 1983 and 1991. "Between 1990 and 2007 at least five members of the church’s staff were told of Morales’s abuse. None notified the police."  Subsequently, Covenant Life Church former pastor Grant Layman [Mahaney's brother-in-law] said, while testifying about allegations against Nathaniel Morales, that he [Layman] had not reported the abuse to the police. Layman was not on trial and was not given an opportunity to clarify his remarks in court. Pastors are not mandatory reporters in the State of Maryland. An independent investigator reported that Morales was never a paid employee of Covenant Life Church. Ennis testified before the Maryland Senate Committee that no one had testified during the Morales trial that the church had advised them not to report.

In November 2013, SGM issued a statement saying that, years after pastoral counsel was sought, "allowing courts to second guess pastoral guidance would represent a blow to the First Amendment." Regarding the accuracy of the plaintiffs' claims, SGM released a statement saying that "SGM is not in a position to comment on the specific allegations at this time, but upon review it appears the complaint contains a number of misleading allegations, as well as considerable mischaracterizations of intent."

Footnotes

External links 
 

Apostolic networks
Christian organizations established in 1982
Evangelical denominations in North America
Reformed denominations in the United States
1982 establishments in the United States
Musicians from Louisville, Kentucky
Musical groups established in 1984
Performers of contemporary worship music
American Christian musical groups